Norwood James Patterson, Jr (born February 18, 1948) is an American politician serving in the California State Assembly. He is a Republican representing the 23rd district, which encompasses eastern Fresno County, including the cities of Fresno and Clovis, and a small slice of Tulare County. He is the former Mayor of Fresno, California.

Early career 
Prior to being elected to public office, he was a business executive and broadcaster owning and operating radio stations in California and Idaho.

Mayor 
Patterson was Mayor of Fresno between 1993 and 2001, defeating incumbent Democrat Karen Humphrey for reelection by a landslide, and being succeeded by Alan Autry.

2002 Congressional election
Patterson ran for the Republican nomination in California's 21st congressional district, a district with new boundaries created through reapportionment after the 2000 United States census.  His opponents were State Assemblyman Mike Briggs and Devin Nunes, the California State Director for the United States Department of Agriculture's Rural Development section.  Patterson came in close second place to Nunes, who would eventually win the general election.

2010 Congressional election
Patterson ran for the Republican nomination in California's 19th congressional district, to take over the seat of retiring Congressman George Radanovich.  He finished second in the June 8, 2010 primary to state Senator Jeff Denham, who won the general election.

Political positions
In the wake of a 2018 shooting spree in Tulare County by an illegal alien, Patterson called on his fellow legislators to change California Sanctuary Law SB54 to allow local law enforcement agencies to cooperate with detainer requests from U.S. Immigration and Customs Enforcement.

Electoral history

See also
List of mayors of Fresno, California

References

External links 
 
 Campaign website

Republican Party members of the California State Assembly
Living people
Mayors of Fresno, California
21st-century American politicians
1948 births